Internet freedom is an umbrella term that encompasses digital rights, freedom of information, the right to Internet access, freedom from Internet censorship, and net neutrality.

Some believe that Internet freedom is not a human right. They think this because putting something like Internet freedom as a human right could weaken what human rights stand for. Going along with this, people pay for, own, and operate these servers and saying someone has a right to them which makes it a claim of entitlement. 
Some countries limit what their citizens can watch and view on the Internet to varying degrees.

"In June 2012, it was declared a human right by the United Nations Human Rights Council."
Some countries have attempted to ban certain sites and or words that would limit internet freedom. "Since the 1990s, European regulators have held American technology firms to higher standards of privacy and competition than American regulators have required them. European regulators have also sought to eliminate from their networks hate speech that is tolerated by the First Amendment but is illegal in Europe."

In today's society, more and more fake information is being posted online prompting many people to not believe what they read on the internet. This is troublesome because many people today use the Internet for their daily news and weather, as opposed to television. This change has continued throughout the past decade and will continue to increase. It allows for the increased flow of information and allows information to be obtained faster than ever before. Events such as elections and disasters are known about within seconds rather than hours or days. Not everywhere relishes in the luxury though. "The People's Republic of China (PRC) has the world's largest number of Internet users, estimated at 330 million people, including 70 million bloggers. It also has one of the most sophisticated and aggressive Internet censorship and control regimes in the world. In 2020 Freedom House ranked China last of 64 nations in internet freedom.

See also 
 Free culture movement
 Freedom of information
 Freedom of speech
 Information wants to be free
 Pirate Party
 Public domain
 Steal This Film

References 

Broad-concept articles
Internet access
Digital rights
Computing and society
Social concepts